Hans Rudolf "Hansruedi" Spillman (born 7 January 1932) is a retired Swiss sports shooter. He won silver medals in the rifle 300 m three positions event at the 1960 Olympics and 1962 World Championships.

References

1932 births
Living people
Swiss male sport shooters
Shooters at the 1960 Summer Olympics
Olympic shooters of Switzerland
Olympic silver medalists for Switzerland
Olympic medalists in shooting
Medalists at the 1960 Summer Olympics
Sportspeople from Zürich